Graham Pearce (born 8 July 1959) is an English footballer who played as a left back in the Football League for Brighton and Hove Albion, Gillingham, Brentford and Maidstone United.

Career 
A left back, Pearce played in the Football League for Brighton and Hove Albion, Gillingham, Brentford and Maidstone United. He played for Brighton & Hove Albion in the 1983 FA Cup Final against Manchester United. He also played in the Conference for Barnet and was player-manager of Isthmian League clubs Enfield and Molesey. He returned to Brentford to serve as first team coach and reserve team coach in the early 1990s. His other coaching roles included first team coach at Farnborough and Stevenage Borough, Assistant Community Development Officer at Wimbledon, Kingston University and Sunday League club Brentford Athletic.

Personal life 
Pearce was born in Hammersmith, London. As of 1999, he was a physical education teacher at Homefield Preparatory School in Sutton, south London.

References 

1959 births
Living people
Footballers from Hammersmith
English footballers
Association football defenders
Barnet F.C. players
Brighton & Hove Albion F.C. players
Gillingham F.C. players
Brentford F.C. players
Maidstone United F.C. (1897) players
Enfield F.C. players
National League (English football) players
English Football League players
English football managers
National League (English football) managers
Brentford F.C. non-playing staff
Hillingdon Borough F.C. players
Isthmian League players
Isthmian League managers
Basingstoke Town F.C. players
Kingstonian F.C. players
Harrow Borough F.C. players
Corinthian-Casuals F.C. players
Enfield F.C. managers
Molesey F.C. players
Molesey F.C. managers
Wimbledon F.C. non-playing staff
FA Cup Final players

Stevenage F.C. non-playing staff